The Cornettes de Bise is a mountain in the Chablais Alps, overlooking Lake Geneva. At 2,432 metres above sea level, it is the highest summit of the subrange running from Pas de Morgins to Lake Geneva. The mountain is located on the border between France (west) and Switzerland (east).

Nearest localities are Miex (Valais) and La Chapelle-d'Abondance (Haute Savoie). Various trails lead to the summit from both sides.

Panorama

See also
List of mountains of Valais
List of most isolated mountains of Switzerland

References

External links
Cornettes de Bise on Summitpost

Mountains of the Alps
Mountains of Switzerland
Mountains of Valais
Two-thousanders of Switzerland